Keith Gledhill (February 16, 1911 – June 2, 1999) was an American tennis player of the 1930s.

Playing career
In 1929 Gledhill won the national junior singles and, partnering Ellsworth Vines, doubles title. He attended Stanford University and in 1931, became the second Stanford player to win the NCAA Men's Singles Championship. In 1932, Gledhill and partner Joe Coughlin won the NCAA Doubles Championship.

In  Grand Slam events, Gledhill and partner Ellsworth Vines won the doubles championship at the U.S. Championships in 1932. Six months later, Gledhill and Vines won the 1933 Australian Championships doubles title. In that tournament, Gledhill also recorded his best Grand Slam singles result. In the quarter finals, Gledhill was 2 sets to 0 and 5–3 down against the finalist of the previous three years, Harry Hopman, but fought back to win. Gledhill then beat Vivian McGrath before losing in the final to Jack Crawford.

In 1930 and 1933 Gledhill reached the final in the singles event of the Pacific Coast Championships on Los Angeles, but lost both finals to George Lott and Lester Stoefen respectively.

Gledhill turned professional in early 1934 and joined a tour with Bill Tilden and Vines.

Grand Slam finals

Singles (1 runner-up)

Doubles (2 titles)

References

External links
 

1911 births
1999 deaths
American male tennis players
Australian Championships (tennis) champions
Sportspeople from Santa Barbara, California
Stanford Cardinal men's tennis players
Tennis people from California
United States National champions (tennis)
Grand Slam (tennis) champions in men's doubles
Professional tennis players before the Open Era
20th-century American people